Samuel Felrath Hines Jr. (November 9, 1913 – October 3, 1993) was an African American visual artist and art conservator. Hines served as a conservator at several institutions, including the Hirshhorn Museum and Sculpture Garden in Washington, D.C., and his paintings can be found in the collection of the Smithsonian American Art Museum.

Life
Born in Indianapolis, Indiana, in 1913, Hines began studying art in 1926 after receiving a scholarship for youth classes at the John Herron School of Art Saturday School. After graduating high school in 1931, Hines worked for the Civilian Conservation Corps and later as a railroad dining car waiter for the Chicago Northwestern Railroad. In 1945, he began his formal art training at the Art Institute of Chicago. After deciding to concentrate on design, Hines moved to New York City, where he worked as a fashion designer and studied at New York University and the Pratt Institute.

In 1963, Hines joined a club of sixteen African-American artists called Spiral, which had been formed by Romare Bearden. Spiral was a loosely structured group of black artists, ranging in age from twenty-eight to sixty-five and in style from minimalism to realism, who sponsored an exhibit of black and white artwork for symbolic reasons. Despite his involvement with the group, Hines wanted his imagery to remain universal and not to be seen as having relevance exclusively to black social causes or to African Americans. As a result, he refused to participate in the Whitney Museum of Art's landmark exhibition Contemporary Black Artists in America.

His work has been associated with the De Stijl movement often containing strong design elements, inspired by Cubism and the simplicity of Piet Mondrian. His work moved from semi-abstract landscapes in the 1940s and 1950s to geometric abstracts. As Hines became more influenced by American modernists, such as Stuart Davis, Ad Reinhardt, Josef Albers, Ellsworth Kelly, and Barnett Newman, he began to eliminate line from his compositions, focusing instead on simple shapes and a restrained color palette.

His works are included in several collections, including the Smithsonian American Art Museum and the Museum of Fine Arts Houston.

References 

Jonson, Ken. ART IN REVIEW; Felrath Hines, New York Times, February 1, 2002

External links 
 Artist website
 "Felrath Hines at Easel", Baltimore Museum of Art

1913 births
1993 deaths
20th-century American painters
American male painters
Painters from New York City
Painters from Indiana
Artists from Indianapolis
Civilian Conservation Corps people
School of the Art Institute of Chicago alumni
New York University alumni
Pratt Institute alumni
Smithsonian Institution people
Conservator-restorers
20th-century African-American painters
20th-century American male artists
Herron School of Art and Design alumni